Mijas Costa is the main commercial and residential zone of, although not limited to, Fuengirola.

Overview 

Covering 12 kilometers, Mijas Costa encompasses El Chaparral, La Cala, Riviera and Calahonda, from East to West respectively. The area is a large tourist hub due to the commercial centers, supermarkets, golf course, sports centers, bars and restaurants.

See also 
 Mijas

References 

Populated places in the Province of Málaga